Sriman Surdas is a 2018 action comedy Odia language feature film directed by Ashok Pati and Produced under banner Tarang Cine Productions. It is a remake of the 2017 Telugu film Andhhagadu.Babushaan and Bhoomika Dash played lead roles in the film.

Cast 
Actress Bhoomika Dash was roped to play lead role opposite actor Babushan. Veteran actor Mihir Das was seen in a negative role in the movie.

 Babushan as Sriman Surdas
 Buddhaditya Mohanty
 Mihir Das
 Bhoomika Dash
 Salil Mitra
 Bobby Mishra

Soundtrack 

The music of this film is composed by Abhijit Majumdar and released on 24 September 2018.

Release 
Sriman Surdas hit theatre on 16 October 2018 during Durga Puja.

References 

2010s Odia-language films
Odia remakes of Telugu films
Films directed by Ashok Pati